Qishan Station is a former train station in Cishan District, Kaohsiung, Taiwan.

History
In the following decade, the railway began to serve passengers. The railway was decommissioned in 1978 with only the station buildings left intact.

Formally abandoned in 1982, it was designated a municipal historic building in 2005, then underwent renovation and was reopened on 27 July 2009 as a tourist attraction in a ceremony attended by Kaohsiung County Magistrate Yang Chiu-hsing.

Architecture
The 1-story station building is made of wood and has an octagonal shape. Its style was influenced by Tudor architecture.

Features
Around the station is the Qishan Old Street, Qishan Cultural Park, and Qishan Elementary School.

See also
 Shengxing Station

References

1912 establishments in Taiwan
Buildings and structures in Kaohsiung
Defunct railway stations in Taiwan
Repurposed railway stations
Tourist attractions in Kaohsiung
Railway stations closed in 1978